Kickboxing was among the sports contested at the 2019 Southeast Asian Games. There were eight events in kickboxing held from 7 to 10 December 2019 at the Cuneta Astrodome in Pasay.

Medal table

Medalists

Kick light

Full contact

Low kick

References

External links
 

Southeast Asian Games 2019
2019 Southeast Asian Games events
Southeast Asian Games